John A. C. Greppin (April 2, 1937 – May 3, 2016) was an American scholar of Armenian studies, linguist, and a professor at the Cleveland State University.

Biography
He attended the Allendale School in Rochester, New York, Dartmouth College, and University of Rochester. Greppin received a Ph.D. in Indo-European Studies at the University of California-Los Angeles in 1972. He taught Greek and Latin at the Woodstock Country School in South Woodstock, Vermont, and was a professor at Cleveland State University from 1975 to 2010. Greppin was an author of 16 books and 500 articles and reviews. His academic specialty was Classical Armenian. He spent a year in Soviet Armenia on a State Department grant in 1974-75. In 1998 he spent a semester in Göttingen, Germany as a visiting Professor. He founded the Annual of Armenian Linguistics and edited it for 25 years. He also co-edited Raft, a Journal of Armenian Poetry and Criticism.

In 2013 he donated his Armenian collection to the National Association for Armenian Studies and Research (NAASR) library.

With his wife Mary E. Greppin (Hannan) they had two children.

Awards
 Distinguished Faculty Award for Research, Cleveland State University (2010)

Works
 The Diffusion of Greco-Roman Medicine into the Middle East and the Caucasus. Emilie Savage-Smith (Editor), John L. Gueriguian (Editor), John AC Greppin (Editor). 1999. 
 Handbook of Armenian Dialectology (Anatolian and Caucasian studies). by John A. C. Greppin, Amalya Khachaturyan, New York : Caravan, 1986, 253 p. 
 "Bark Galianosi": The Greek-Armenian Dictionary to Galen. Author: John AC Greppin. December 1985. 
 Interrogativity: A Colloquium on the Grammar, Typology, and Pragmatics of Questions in Seven Diverse Languages, Cleveland, Ohio, October 5th, 1981-May 3rd, 1982. Author: John AC Greppin, Louis Tonko Milic, William Chisholm. January 1984. ;
 Studies in Classical Armenian Literature (Anatolian and Caucasian Studies), by John A. C. Greppin, 1994, 261 p.

References

External links
John Greppin - The Urartian Influence on the Earliest Armenians

1937 births
2016 deaths
American scientists
20th-century linguists
21st-century linguists
American social scientists
Indo-Europeanists
Linguists of Indo-European languages
Linguists from the United States
Armenian studies scholars